Phlegm is a Welsh-born Sheffield-based muralist and artist who first developed his illustrations in self-published comics. The name 'Phlegm' came from one of the four temperaments in ancient Greek medicine: blood, yellow bile, black bile, and phlegm. Phlegm was believed to be responsible for an apathetic and unemotional temperament.

Overview
Phlegm's work features in the urban landscape, and can mostly be seen in run-down and disused spaces. Phlegm creates surreal illustrations to an untold story, weaving a visual narrative that explores the unreal through creatures from his imagination.

Phlegm's storybook-like imagery is half childlike, half menacing, set in built up Cityscapes with castles, turrets and winding stairways. At other times the city itself is the setting for his long limbed half-human, half-woodland creatures. In this dream world a viewer comes across impossible flying machines and complex networks of levers, pulleys and cogs, set beside telescopes, magnifying glasses and zephyrs. Working mostly in monochrome, his fine technique and intricate detail can be seen as a curiosity cabinet of the mind. Each drawing forms part of a grand narrative that extends worldwide, in countries including Norway, Canada, Switzerland, Sri Lanka, USA, Belgium, Poland, Italy, Slovakia, Spain and Australia. His work has also appeared in a variety of objects such as airplanes, boats, buildings, vehicles and many street art festivals.

Exhibitions
Phlegm's first solo show The Bestiary took place at the Howard Griffin Gallery on Shoreditch High Street, London from 1 February to 25 March 2014.

In April 2019 he hosted 'Mausoleum of the Giants' in Sheffield, attracting over 12,000 visitors.

Murals
In January 2013, Phlegm painted on the Village Underground wall in London, UK.

In February 2014, Phlegm teamed up with RUN and Christiaan Nagel on a mission to give final moments of vivacious life to yet another to be demolished building in London – the Blithehale Medical Centre in Bethnal Green.

In April and May 2014, Phlegm was one of several overseas artists to paint a series of murals in Dunedin, New Zealand as part of that city's Urban art festival. Other artists involved included Italy's Pixel Pancho and Poland's Natalia Rak.

Phlegm was one of around 150 artists to paint murals in the Djerbahood Project in Erriadh, Tunisia, in the summer of 2014.

In August 2016, Phlegm painted what was billed as the world's tallest mural to that time (8 storeys) in Toronto at 1 St. Clair West. Toronto resident Stephanie Bellefleur was his assistant.

References

External links
 Phlegm official website

Year of birth missing (living people)
Living people
Artists from Sheffield
Street artists
Welsh illustrators